Micaela Casasola (born 17 March 1997) is an Argentine handball player for Club Balonmano Porriño and the Argentine national team.

She competed as a junior at the 2014 IHF Women's Junior World Championship in Mazedonia.

Club career
Micaela started at Club Atlético Vélez Sarsfield as a junior and after a short stint in England returned to  Vélez Sarsfield for another 4 years before she joined Spanish Club Club Balonmano Porriño.

International career
In January 2015, Micaela joined the English Thames Handball Club for a period of 3 months to further her understanding of English and to gain experience in a foreign handball league.

Personal life
Older brother Tiago Casasola is an Argentine football player, who plays for Italian B club Trapani and the Argentina national under-20 football team after a short stint at English club. Fulham F.C.

References

Argentine female handball players
1997 births
Living people
Expatriate handball players
Argentine expatriate sportspeople in England
South American Games silver medalists for Argentina
South American Games medalists in handball
Competitors at the 2018 South American Games
Handball players at the 2019 Pan American Games
Pan American Games medalists in handball
Pan American Games silver medalists for Argentina
Medalists at the 2019 Pan American Games
21st-century Argentine women